Lobesia fuligana is a moth belonging to the family Tortricidae. The species was first described by Adrian Hardy Haworth in 1811. It is found in Europe.

The wingspan is 10-13 mm. The forewings are ochreous-whitish, strigulated with dark fuscous.The basal patch, the central fascia, and a terminal fascia which is narrowed to the tornus are dark brown. The hindwings are grey. The larva is blue-green ; head and plate of 2 yellowish-brown:

This species is bivoltine flying in two generations in May and again in July-August. They are active at dusk.

The larva lives in spun shoots on: Echium vulgare, Anchusa officinalis, Artemesia and Cirsium arvense. Pupation takes places in a cocoon, spun amongst surface litter.

References

External links
lepiforum.de as synonym of Lobesia abscisana (Doubleday, [1849])

Olethreutini